In numerical analysis Gauss–Laguerre quadrature (named after Carl Friedrich Gauss and Edmond Laguerre) is an extension of the Gaussian quadrature method for approximating the value of integrals of the following kind:

In this case 

where xi is the i-th root of Laguerre polynomial Ln(x) and the weight wi is given by

def lag_weights_roots(n):
    x = Symbol("x")
    roots = Poly(laguerre(n, x)).all_roots()
    x_i = [rt.evalf(20) for rt in roots]
    w_i = [(rt / ((n + 1) * laguerre(n + 1, rt)) ** 2).evalf(20) for rt in roots]
    return x_i, w_i

print(lag_weights_roots(5))

For more general functions

To integrate the function  we apply the following transformation

where . For the last integral
one then uses Gauss-Laguerre quadrature. Note, that while this approach works
from an analytical perspective, it is not always numerically stable.

Generalized Gauss–Laguerre quadrature

More generally, one can also consider integrands that have a known  power-law singularity at x=0, for some real number , leading to integrals of the form:

In this case, the weights are given in terms of the generalized Laguerre polynomials:

This allows one to efficiently evaluate such integrals for polynomial or smooth f(x) even when α is not an integer.

References

Further reading

External links
 Matlab routine for Gauss–Laguerre quadrature
 Generalized Gauss–Laguerre quadrature, free software in Matlab, C++, and Fortran.

Numerical integration (quadrature)